Llandogo Halt was a request stop on the former Wye Valley Railway. It was opened on 9 March 1927 to serve the village of Llandogo. It was closed in 1959 following the withdrawal of passenger services on the line. It was the smallest construction on the Wye Valley Railway.

References

Disused railway stations in Monmouthshire
Former Great Western Railway stations
Railway stations in Great Britain opened in 1927
Railway stations in Great Britain closed in 1959